A National Biodiversity Conservation Area (NBCA) is an environmentally protected area in Laos. There are all together 21 different NBCAs in Laos, protecting 29,775 square kilometers. Another 10 NBCAs have been proposed, many of them being treated by authorities as though they were already officially protected.

List of NBCAs 

Corridor Nakai - Nam Theun and Phou Hin Poun National Biodiversity Conservation Area
Dong Ampham National Biodiversity Conservation Area 
Dong Hua Sao National Protected Area	 
Dong Phou Vieng National Protected Area
Hin Nam No National Biodiversity Conservation Area	 
Houei Nhang Conservation Area
Khammouane Limestone National Biodiversity Conservation Area	
Nakai - Nam Theun National Biodiversity Conservation Area	 
Nam Chuane Conservation Area	 
Nam Et National Biodiversity Conservation Area
Nam Ha National Protected Area
Nam Kading National Protected Area	 
Nam Kan 	 
Nam Phouy National Biodiversity Conservation Area	 
Nam Theun Ext. National Biodiversity Conservation Area 
Nam Xam National Biodiversity Conservation Area	 
Phou Den Din National Biodiversity Conservation Area
Phou Kateup (Bolovens Northeast)
Phou Kathong	 
Phou Khao Khoay National Biodiversity Conservation Area		 
Phou Louey National Biodiversity Conservation Area	
Phou Phanang National Biodiversity Conservation Area	 
Phou Theung	 
Phou Xang He National Protected Area	 
Phou Xieng Thong National Protected Area	 
Phu Luang (Boloven SW)	 
Xe Bang Nouan National Biodiversity Conservation Area 
Xe Khampho	 
Xe Pian National Protected Area 
Xe Xap National Biodiversity Conservation Area 
Xekhampo-Boloven Plateau Hunting Reserve

See also
 Geography of Laos

References

External links 
Lao People’s Democratic Republic - National Report on Protected Areas and Development
 Ecotourism Laos - Protected Areas
 IUCN review (PDF)
 Protected Areas Development report
 Maps of Protected Areas

 
Laos
Laos geography-related lists
Geography of Laos
Protected areas of Laos
Lists of tourist attractions in Laos